Brockhall Village is a gated community in the Ribble Valley, Lancashire, England and home to the training facilities for Blackburn Rovers F.C. The village is in the civil parish of Billington and Langho and is  north of Blackburn. It is built on the site of a former hospital.

Brockhall Hospital
Brockhall Hospital was claimed to be one of Europe's largest mental institutions. It was built in 1904 as an Inebriate Women's Reformatory, later becoming a hospital for people with learning disabilities.

The hospital was closed by the NHS in 1992 as part of the government's Care in the Community policy.

Brockhall Village
Property tycoon Gerald Hitman (who died on 4 June 2009) was the man behind the Brockhall Village development.

Originally from London, the successful businessman made his fortune in the North East, buying and selling property leases and freeholds. In 1982 he bought a package of deeds to properties in Lancashire, among them a 999-year lease for Brockhall Hospital, at Old Langho. A decade later when the hospital closed he was able to develop the land to form the multimillion-pound Brockhall village, a gated community, which now contains more than 400 homes, as well as the Blackburn Rovers' training ground and a hotel, restaurant, and a few other local businesses including a gym, hairdressers, coffee shop, and more.

Hitman also built his unique home in the village, The Old Zoo, which he had recently sold. It had been on the market for £2million. The property was described by one expert as the "best contemporary house built in Britain since the 1930s" and featured  of grounds including more than 100 sculptures. It also included a hot tub, swimming pool, a large pond, an outdoor "chapel", a tennis court; a beech maze and a croquet lawn. In 2004 he opened the gates to his gardens for tours, priced at £5.

References

External links

 Directions to Brockhall from Blackburn Rovers website.
 The Old Zoo Garden Review

Villages in Lancashire
Geography of Ribble Valley
Gated communities in the United Kingdom